Roger Joseph Ebert (June 18, 1942 – April 4, 2013) was an American film critic, film historian, journalist, screenwriter, and author. He was a film critic for the Chicago Sun-Times from 1967 until his death in 2013. In 1975, Ebert became the first film critic to win the Pulitzer Prize for Criticism. Neil Steinberg of the Chicago Sun-Times said Ebert "was without question the nation's most prominent and influential film critic," and Kenneth Turan of the Los Angeles Times called him "the best-known film critic in America."

Ebert was known for his intimate, Midwestern writing voice and critical views informed by values of populism and humanism. Writing in a prose style intended to be entertaining and direct, he made sophisticated cinematic and analytical ideas more accessible to non-specialist audiences. While a populist, Ebert frequently endorsed foreign and independent films he believed would be appreciated by mainstream viewers, which often resulted in such films receiving greater exposure. Critic A. O. Scott wrote that Ebert's prose had a "plain-spoken Midwestern clarity" and a "genial, conversational presence on the page", adding that "His criticism shows a nearly unequaled grasp of film history and technique, and formidable intellectual range, but he rarely seems to be showing off. He's just trying to tell you what he thinks, and to provoke some thought on your part on how movies work and what they can do."

Ebert and Chicago Tribune critic Gene Siskel helped popularize nationally televised film reviewing when they co-hosted the PBS show Sneak Previews, followed by several variously named At the Movies programs. The two verbally sparred and traded humorous barbs while discussing films. They created and trademarked the phrase "two thumbs up," used when both gave the same film a positive review. After Siskel died in 1999, Ebert continued hosting the show with various co-hosts and then, starting in 2000, with Richard Roeper.

Ebert was diagnosed with cancer of the thyroid and salivary glands in 2002. He required treatment that included removing a section of his lower jaw in 2006, leaving him severely disfigured and unable to speak or eat normally. However, his ability to write remained unimpaired and he continued to publish frequently online and in print until his death on April 4, 2013. His RogerEbert.com website, launched in 2002 and originally underwritten by the Chicago Sun-Times, remains online as an archive of his published writings and reviews while also hosting new material written by a group of critics who were selected by Ebert before his death. Richard Corliss wrote that "Roger leaves a legacy of indefatigable conoisseurship in movies, literature, politics and, to quote the title of his 2011 autobiography, Life Itself." In 2014, a documentary adaptation of Life Itself was released to positive reviews.

Early life
Roger Joseph Ebert was born in Urbana, Illinois, the only child of Annabel (née Stumm, 1911–1987), a bookkeeper, and Walter Harry Ebert (1901–1960), an electrician. He was raised Roman Catholic, attending St. Mary's elementary school and serving as an altar boy in Urbana.

His paternal grandparents were German immigrants and his maternal ancestry was Irish and Dutch. Ebert's interest in journalism began when he was a student at Urbana High School, where he was a sportswriter for The News-Gazette in Champaign, Illinois; however, he began his writing career with letters of comment to the science-fiction fanzines of the era.  In his senior year, he was class president and co-editor of his high school newspaper, The Echo. In 1958, he won the Illinois High School Association state speech championship in "radio speaking," an event that simulates radio newscasts.

Regarding his early influences in film criticism, Ebert wrote in the 1998 parody collection Mad About the Movies:

Ebert began taking classes at the University of Illinois at Urbana–Champaign as an early-entrance student, completing his high school courses while also taking his first university class. After graduating from Urbana High School in 1960, Ebert then attended and received his undergraduate degree in 1964. While at the University of Illinois, Ebert worked as a reporter for The Daily Illini and then served as its editor during his senior year while also continuing to work as a reporter for the News-Gazette of Champaign-Urbana, Illinois. (He had begun at the News-Gazette at age 15 covering Urbana High School sports.) His college mentor was Daniel Curley, who "introduced me to many of the cornerstones of my life's reading: "The Love Song of J. Alfred Prufrock", Crime and Punishment, Madame Bovary, The Ambassadors, Nostromo, The Professor's House, The Great Gatsby, The Sound and the Fury... He approached these works with undisguised admiration. We discussed patterns of symbolism, felicities of symbolism, motivation, revelation of character. This was appreciation, not the savagery of deconstruction, which approaches literature as pliers do a rose." Years later, Ebert would coauthor The Perfect London Walk with Curley. At the Daily Illini Ebert befriended William Nack, who as a sportswriter would cover Secretariat. As an undergraduate, he was a member of the Phi Delta Theta fraternity and president of the U.S. Student Press Association. One of the first movie reviews he ever wrote was a review of La Dolce Vita, published in The Daily Illini in October 1961.

Ebert spent a semester as a master's student in the department of English there before attending the University of Cape Town on a Rotary fellowship for a year. He returned from Cape Town to his graduate studies at Illinois for two more semesters and then, after being accepted as a PhD student at the University of Chicago, he prepared to move to Chicago. He needed a job to support himself while he worked on his doctorate and so applied to the Chicago Daily News, hoping that, as he had already sold freelance pieces to the Daily News, including an article on the death of writer Brendan Behan, he would be hired by editor Herman Kogan. Instead, Kogan referred Ebert to the city editor at the Chicago Sun-Times, Jim Hoge, who hired Ebert as a reporter and feature writer at the Sun-Times in 1966. He attended doctoral classes at the University of Chicago while working as a general reporter at the Sun-Times for a year. After movie critic Eleanor Keane left the Sun-Times in April 1967, editor Robert Zonka gave the job to Ebert. The load of graduate school and being a film critic proved too much, so Ebert left the University of Chicago to focus his energies on film criticism.

Career

Writing
Ebert began his career as a film critic in 1967, writing for the Chicago Sun-Times. That same year, he met film critic Pauline Kael for the first time at the New York Film Festival. After he sent her some of his columns, she told him they were "the best film criticism being done in American newspapers today." That same year, Ebert's first book, a history of the University of Illinois titled Illini Century: One Hundred Years of Campus Life, was published by the university's press. In 1969, his review of Night of the Living Dead was published in Reader's Digest. Ebert was one of the first critics to champion Bonnie and Clyde, calling it "a milestone in the history of American movies, a work of truth and brilliance. It is also pitilessly cruel, filled with sympathy, nauseating, funny, heartbreaking and astonishingly beautiful. If it does not seem that those words should be strung together, perhaps that is because movies do not very often reflect the full range of human life." He concluded: "The fact that the story is set 35 years ago doesn't mean a thing. It had to be set some time. But it was made now and it's about us." Thirty one years later, he wrote "When I saw it, I had been a film critic for less than six months, and it was the first masterpiece I had seen on the job. I felt an exhilaration beyond describing. I did not suspect how long it would be between such experiences, but at least I learned that they were possible." He wrote Martin Scorsese's first review, for Who's That Knocking at My Door?, and predicted the young director could become "an American Fellini."

In addition to film, Ebert occasionally wrote about other topics for the Sun-Times, such as music. In 1970, Ebert wrote the first published concert review of singer-songwriter John Prine, who at the time was working as a mailman and performing at Chicago folk clubs.

Ebert co-wrote the screenplay for the Russ Meyer film Beyond the Valley of the Dolls (1970) and sometimes joked about being responsible for the film, which was poorly received on its release yet has become a cult film. Ebert and Meyer also made Up! (1976), Beneath the Valley of the Ultra-Vixens (1979), and other films, and were involved in the ill-fated Sex Pistols movie Who Killed Bambi? In April 2010, Ebert posted his screenplay of Who Killed Bambi?, also known as Anarchy in the UK, on his blog.

Beginning in 1968, Ebert worked for the University of Chicago as an adjunct lecturer, teaching a night class on film at the Graham School of Continuing Liberal and Professional Studies.

In 1975, Ebert received the Pulitzer Prize for Criticism.

In October 1986, while continuing to work for the Sun-Times and still based in Chicago, Ebert replaced Rex Reed as the New York Post chief film reviewer.

As of 2007, his reviews were syndicated to more than 200 newspapers in the United States and abroad. Ebert also published more than 20 books and dozens of collected reviews.

Even as he used TV (and later the Internet) to share his reviews, Ebert continued to write for the Chicago Sun-Times until he died in 2013.

Siskel & Ebert

Also in 1975, Ebert and Gene Siskel began co-hosting a weekly film-review television show, Sneak Previews, which was locally produced by the Chicago public broadcasting station WTTW. The series was later picked up for national syndication on PBS. The duo became well known for their "thumbs up/thumbs down" review summaries. Siskel and Ebert trademarked the phrase "Two Thumbs Up."

In 1982, they moved from PBS to launch a similar syndicated commercial television show named At the Movies With Gene Siskel & Roger Ebert. In 1986, they again moved the show to new ownership, creating Siskel & Ebert & the Movies through Buena Vista Television, part of the Walt Disney Company.

After Siskel died in 1999, the producers retitled the show Roger Ebert & the Movies and used rotating co-hosts including Martin Scorsese, A.O. Scott, and Janet Maslin.

In September 2000, Chicago Sun-Times columnist Richard Roeper became the permanent co-host and the show was renamed At the Movies with Ebert & Roeper and later At the Movies.

In 2000, Ebert interviewed President Bill Clinton at The White House. Clinton spoke about his love for the movies, his favorite films of 1999, and his favorite films of all time, such as Casablanca (1942), High Noon (1952) and The Ten Commandments (1956). Clinton named Meryl Streep, Robert De Niro, and Tom Hanks as his favorite actors.

In 2005, Ebert became the first film critic to receive a star on the Hollywood Walk of Fame.

Later career

Ebert ended his association with the Disney-owned At The Movies in July 2008, after the studio indicated it wished to take the program in a new direction. On February 18, 2009, Ebert reported that he and Roeper would soon announce a new movie-review program, and reiterated this plan after Disney announced that the program's last episode would air in August 2010.

On January 31, 2009, Ebert was made an honorary life member of the Directors Guild of America. His final television series, Ebert Presents: At the Movies, premiered on January 21, 2011, with Ebert contributing a review voiced by Bill Kurtis in a brief segment called "Roger's Office," as well as featuring more traditional film reviews in the "At the Movies" format presented by Christy Lemire and Ignatiy Vishnevetsky. The program lasted one season, before being cancelled due to funding constraints and the subsequent death of Ebert.

The last review by Ebert published during his lifetime was for the film The Host, which was published on March 27, 2013. The last review Ebert wrote was for the film To the Wonder, which he gave 3.5 out of 4 stars in a review for the Chicago Sun-Times. It was posthumously published on April 6, 2013. In July 2013, a previously unpublished review of the film Computer Chess appeared on Ebert's website. The review had been written in March but had remained unpublished until the film's wide-release date. Matt Zoller Seitz, the editor for Ebert's website, confirmed that there were other unpublished reviews that would be eventually uploaded to the website. A second review, for The Spectacular Now, was published in August 2013.

Film and TV appearances
Ebert and Siskel were known for their many appearances on late night talk shows including appearances on The Late Show with David Letterman sixteen times and The Tonight Show Starring Johnny Carson fifteen times. They also appeared together on The Oprah Winfrey Show, The Arsenio Hall Show, Howard Stern, The Tonight Show with Jay Leno, and Late Night with Conan O'Brien.

In 1982, 1983, and 1985, Ebert, along with Siskel, appeared as themselves on Saturday Night Live. For their first two appearances, they reviewed sketches from that night's telecast and reviewed sketches from the "SNL Film Festival" for their last appearance.

In 1991, Ebert, along with Siskel, appeared in a segment on the children's television series Sesame Street entitled "Sneak Peak Previews" (a parody of Sneak Previews). In the segment, the critics instruct the hosts Oscar the Grouch and Telly Monster on how their thumbs up/thumbs down rating system works. Oscar asks if there could be a thumbs sideways ratings, and goads the two men into an argument about whether or not would be acceptable, as Ebert likes the idea, but Siskel does not. The two were also seen  that same year in the show's celebrity version of "Monster in the Mirror". In 2004, Ebert appeared in the Sesame Street franchise's direct-to-video special A Celebration of Me, Grover, delivering a review of the Monsterpiece Theater segment of "The King and I".

In 1995, Ebert and Siskel guest-starred on an episode of the animated TV series The Critic. In the episode, Siskel and Ebert split and each wants protagonist Jay Sherman, a fellow movie critic, as his new partner. The episode is a parody of the film Sleepless in Seattle. The following year, Ebert appeared in Pitch, a documentary by Canadian filmmakers Spencer Rice and Kenny Hotz. He made an appearance as himself in a 1997 episode of the television series Early Edition, which took place in Chicago. In the episode, Ebert consoles a young boy who is depressed after he sees a character called Bosco the Bunny die in a movie.

In 1999, Ebert founded his own film festival, Ebertfest, in his hometown, Champaign, Illinois.

In 2003, Ebert made a cameo appearance in the film Abby Singer. On May 4, 2010, Ebert was announced by the International Academy of Digital Arts and Sciences as the Webby Person of the Year, having taken to the Internet following his battle with cancer. On October 22, 2010, Ebert appeared on camera with Robert Osborne on the Turner Classic Movies network during the network's "The Essentials" series. Ebert chose the films Sweet Smell of Success and The Lady Eve to be shown.

For many years, on the day of the Academy Awards ceremony, Ebert appeared with Roeper on the live pre-awards show, An Evening at the Academy Awards: The Arrivals. This aired for over a decade, usually prior to the awards ceremony show, which also featured red carpet interviews and fashion commentary. They also appeared on the post-awards show entitled An Evening at the Academy Awards: The Winners, produced and aired by the ABC-owned KABC-TV in Los Angeles.

Ebert was one of the principal critics featured in Gerald Peary's 2009 documentary film For the Love of Movies: The Story of American Film Criticism. He is shown discussing the dynamics of appearing with Gene Siskel on the 1970s show Coming to a Theatre Near You, which was the predecessor of Sneak Previews on Chicago PBS station WTTW. He also expressed his approval of the proliferation of young people writing film reviews today on the internet.

Ebert provided DVD audio commentaries for several films, including Citizen Kane, Casablanca, Dark City, Floating Weeds, Crumb, and Beyond the Valley of the Dolls. Ebert was also interviewed by Central Park Media for an extra feature on the DVD release of the anime film Grave of the Fireflies. A bio-documentary about Ebert, called Life Itself, was released in 2014.

Though not making a personal appearance, an honorary effigy of Ebert co-starred in the 1998 reimagined version of Godzilla, played by actor Michael Lerner as New York City Mayor Ebert.

Critical style
Ebert cited Andrew Sarris and Pauline Kael as influences, and often quoted Robert Warshow, who said: "A man goes to the movies. A critic must be honest enough to admit he is that man." He tried to judge a movie on its style rather than its content, and often said "It's not what a movie is about, it's how it's about what it's about." He awarded four stars to films of the highest quality, and generally a half star to those of the lowest, unless he considered the film to be "artistically inept and morally repugnant", in which case it received no stars, for example, Death Wish II. He emphasized that his star ratings had little meaning if not considered in the context of the review itself.

Metacritic later noted that Ebert tended to give more lenient ratings than most critics. His average film rating was 71%, if translated into a percentage, compared to 59% for the site as a whole. Of his reviews, 75% were positive and 75% of his ratings were better than his colleagues. Ebert had acknowledged in 2008 that he gave higher ratings on average than other critics, though he said this was in part because he considered a rating of 3 out of 4 stars to be the general threshold for a film to get a "thumbs up." Although Ebert rarely wrote outright-scathing reviews, he had a reputation for writing memorable ones for the films he really disliked, such as North. Of that film, he wrote “I hated this movie. Hated hated hated hated hated this movie. Hated it. Hated every simpering stupid vacant audience-insulting moment of it. Hated the sensibility that thought anyone would like it. Hated the implied insult to the audience by its belief that anyone would be entertained by it.” A collection of his pans was published as I Hated, Hated, Hated This Movie. He wrote that Mad Dog Time "is the first movie I have seen that does not improve on the sight of a blank screen viewed for the same length of time. Oh, I've seen bad movies before. But they usually made me care about how bad they were. Watching Mad Dog Time is like waiting for the bus in a city where you're not sure they have a bus line" and  concluded that the film "should be cut up to provide free ukulele picks for the poor." Of Caligula, he wrote "It is not good art, it is not good cinema, and it is not good porn" and approvingly quoted the woman in front of him at the drinking fountain, who called it "the worst piece of shit I have ever seen."

Ebert's reviews were also characterized by what has been called "dry wit." He often wrote in a deadpan style when discussing a movie's flaws; in his review of Jaws: The Revenge, he wrote that Mrs. Brody's "friends pooh-pooh the notion that a shark could identify, follow or even care about one individual human being, but I am willing to grant the point, for the benefit of the plot. I believe that the shark wants revenge against Mrs. Brody. I do. I really do believe it. After all, her husband was one of the men who hunted this shark and killed it, blowing it to bits. And what shark wouldn’t want revenge against the survivors of the men who killed it? Here are some things, however, that I do not believe" and went on to list the other ways the film strained credulity. In August 2005, after Rob Schneider insulted Los Angeles Times movie critic Patrick Goldstein (who had criticized Schneider's film Deuce Bigalow: European Gigolo) by commenting that Goldstein was unqualified because he had never won the Pulitzer Prize, Ebert intervened by stating that, as a Pulitzer winner, he was qualified to review the film, and bluntly told Schneider, "Your movie sucks." He later used this phrase as a title for another collection of his pans. After Ebert's illness, Schneider sent him flowers, signed "Your Least Favorite Movie Star." Ebert wrote that while Schneider made a bad film, he was not a bad man, and would be happy to give him a good review some day.

Ebert often included personal anecdotes in his reviews; in his review of The Last Picture Show, he recalls his early days as a moviegoer: "For five or six years of my life (the years between when I was old enough to go alone, and when TV came to town) Saturday afternoon at the Princess was a descent into a dark magical cave that smelled of Jujubes, melted Dreamsicles and Crisco in the popcorn machine. It was probably on one of those Saturday afternoons that I formed my first critical opinion, deciding vaguely that there was something about John Wayne that that set him apart from ordinary cowboys." He occasionally wrote reviews in the forms of stories, poems, songs, scripts, open letters, or imagined conversations.

Alex Ross, music critic for The New Yorker, wrote of how Ebert had influenced his writing:  "I noticed how much Ebert could put across in a limited space. He didn’t waste time clearing his throat. 'They meet for the first time when she is in her front yard practicing baton-twirling,' begins his review of Badlands. Often, he managed to smuggle the basics of the plot into a larger thesis about the movie, so that you don’t notice the exposition taking place: 'Broadcast News is as knowledgeable about the TV news-gathering process as any movie ever made, but it also has insights into the more personal matter of how people use high-pressure jobs as a way of avoiding time alone with themselves.' The reviews start off in all different ways, sometimes with personal confessions, sometimes with sweeping statements. One way or another, he pulls you in. When he feels strongly, he can bang his fist in an impressive way. His review of Apocalypse Now ends thus: 'The whole huge grand mystery of the world, so terrible, so beautiful, seems to hang in the balance.'"

In his introduction to The Great Movies III, he writes:

“People often ask me, ‘Do you ever change your mind about a movie?’ Hardly ever, although I may refine my opinion. Among the films here, I’ve changed on The Godfather Part II and Blade Runner. My original review of Part II puts me in mind of the ‘brain cloud’ that besets Tom Hanks in Joe Versus the Volcano. I was simply wrong. In the case of Blade Runner, I think the director’s cut by Ridley Scott simply plays much better. I also turned around on Groundhog Day, which made it into this book when I belatedly caught on that it wasn’t about the weatherman’s predicament but about the nature of time and will. Perhaps when I first saw it I allowed myself to be distracted by Bill Murray's mainstream comedy reputation. But someone in film school somewhere is probably even now writing a thesis about how Murray's famous cameos represent an injection of philosophy into those pictures.”

In the first Great Movies, he wrote that:

Preferences

Favorites
In an essay looking back at his first twenty-five years as a film critic, Ebert wrote:

Ebert argued for the aesthetic values of black-and-white photography and against colorization, writing: 

Elsewhere, Ebert wrote that "Black and white (or, more accurately, silver and white) creates a mysterious dream state, a world of form and gesture." For readers who didn't appreciate black and white, he offered the following experiment: "Go outside at dusk, when the daylight is diffused. Stand on the side of the house away from the sunset. Shoot some natural-light portraits of a friend in black and white. Ask yourself if this friend, who has always looked ordinary in every color photograph you've ever taken, does not, in black and white, take on an aura of mystery. The same thing happens in the movies."

Ebert championed animation, particularly the films of Japanese directors Hayao Miyazaki and Isao Takahata. In his review of Miyazaki's Princess Mononoke, he wrote: "I go to the movies for many reasons. Here is one of them. I want to see wondrous sights not available in the real world, in stories where myth and dreams are set free to play. Animation opens that possibility, because it is freed from gravity and the chains of the possible. Realistic films show the physical world; animation shows its essence. Animated films are not copies of 'real movies,' are not shadows of reality, but create a new existence in their own right." He concluded his review of Ratatouille by writing: "Every time an animated film is successful, you have to read all over again about how animation isn't 'just for children' but 'for the whole family,' and 'even for adults going on their own.' No kidding!"

Ebert said that his favorite film was Citizen Kane, joking, "That's the official answer," although he preferred to emphasize it as "the most important" film. He said seeing The Third Man cemented his love of cinema: "This movie is on the altar of my love for the cinema. I saw it for the first time in a little fleabox of a theater on the Left Bank in Paris, in 1962, during my first $5 a day trip to Europe. It was so sad, so beautiful, so romantic, that it became at once a part of my own memories -- as if it had happened to me." He implied that his real favorite film was La Dolce Vita. His favorite actor was Robert Mitchum, and his favorite actress was Ingrid Bergman. He also considered Buster Keaton, Yasujiro Ozu, Robert Altman, Werner Herzog, and Martin Scorsese to be his favorite directors. He expressed his general distaste for "top-10" lists, and all movie lists in general, but did contribute a top-10 list to the 2012 Sight & Sound Critics' poll. Listed alphabetically, those films were 2001: A Space Odyssey, Aguirre, the Wrath of God, Apocalypse Now, Citizen Kane, La Dolce Vita, The General, Raging Bull, Tokyo Story, The Tree of Life and Vertigo. His favorite Bond film was Goldfinger (1964), and he later added it to his "Great Movies" list. Several of the contributors to Ebert's website participated in a video tribute to him, featuring films that made his Sight & Sound list in 1982 and 2012.

Best films of the year
Ebert compiled "best of the year" movie lists beginning in 1967 until 2012, thereby helping provide an overview of his critical preferences.  His top choices were:

 1967: Bonnie and Clyde
 1968: The Battle of Algiers
 1969: Z
 1970: Five Easy Pieces
 1971: The Last Picture Show
 1972: The Godfather
 1973: Cries and Whispers
 1974: Scenes from a Marriage
 1975: Nashville
 1976: Small Change
 1977: 3 Women
 1978: An Unmarried Woman
 1979: Apocalypse Now
 1980: The Black Stallion
 1981: My Dinner with Andre
 1982: Sophie's Choice
 1983: The Right Stuff
 1984: Amadeus
 1985: The Color Purple
 1986: Platoon
 1987: House of Games
 1988: Mississippi Burning
 1989: Do the Right Thing
 1990: Goodfellas
 1991: JFK
 1992: Malcolm X
 1993: Schindler's List
 1994: Hoop Dreams
 1995: Leaving Las Vegas
 1996: Fargo
 1997: Eve's Bayou
 1998: Dark City
 1999: Being John Malkovich
 2000: Almost Famous
 2001: Monster's Ball
 2002: Minority Report
 2003: Monster
 2004: Million Dollar Baby
 2005: Crash
 2006: Pan's Labyrinth
 2007: Juno
 2008: Synecdoche, New York
 2009: The Hurt Locker
 2010: The Social Network
 2011: A Separation
 2012: Argo

Ebert revisited and sometimes revised his opinions. After ranking E.T. the Extra-Terrestrial third on his 1982 list, it was the only movie from that year to appear on his later "Best Films of the 1980s" list (where it also ranked third). He made similar reevaluations of Raiders of the Lost Ark (1981) and Ran (1985). Three Colours trilogy (Blue (1993), White (1994), and Red (also 1994)), and Pulp Fiction (1994) originally ranked second and third on Ebert's 1994 list; both were included on his "Best Films of the 1990s" list, but their order had reversed.

In 2006, Ebert noted his own "tendency to place what I now consider the year's best film in second place, perhaps because I was trying to make some kind of point with my top pick," adding, "In 1968, I should have ranked 2001 above The Battle of Algiers.  In 1971, McCabe & Mrs. Miller was better than The Last Picture Show.  In 1974, Chinatown was probably better, in a different way, than Scenes from a Marriage.  In 1976, how could I rank Small Change above Taxi Driver?  In 1978, I would put Days of Heaven above An Unmarried Woman. And in 1980, of course, Raging Bull was a better film than The Black Stallion ... although I later chose Raging Bull as the best film of the entire decade of the 1980s, it was only the second-best film of 1980 ... am I the same person I was in 1968, 1971, or 1980? I hope not."

Since Ebert died, the practice has continued since 2014 with his website.  The primary contributors do a Borda count where each critic ranks films, with ten points for the first-placed film to one point for the tenth-placed film.  The scores are compiled and best film of the year is based on poll results.

 2014:  Under the Skin
 2015:  Mad Max: Fury Road
 2016:  Moonlight
 2017:  Lady Bird
 2018:  Roma
 2019:  The Irishman
 2020:  Small Axe: Lovers Rock
 2021:  The Power of the Dog 2022:  The Banshees of InisherinGenres and content
Ebert was often critical of the Motion Picture Association of America film rating system (MPAA). His main arguments were that they were too strict on sex and profanity, too lenient on violence, secretive with their guidelines, inconsistent in applying them and not willing to consider the wider context and meaning of the film. He advocated replacing the NC-17 rating with separate ratings for pornographic and nonpornographic adult films. He signed off on his review of Almost Famous by asking, "Why did they give an R rating to a movie so perfect for teenagers?"

Ebert also frequently lamented that cinemas outside major cities are "booked by computer from Hollywood with no regard for local tastes," making high-quality independent and foreign films virtually unavailable to most American moviegoers.

In his review of The Exorcist, he wrote that "I’ve always preferred a generic approach to film criticism; I ask myself how good a movie is of its type." Some horror movie fans accused Ebert of elitism and prejudice against the horror genre, especially because of his dismissive comments about "Dead Teenager Movies." In 2007, Ebert responded to a question from a horror movie reviewer by saying that he did not disparage horror movies as a whole. He wrote that he drew a distinction between films like Nosferatu and The Silence of the Lambs, which he regarded as "masterpieces," and those that had no content other than teenagers being killed. Ebert gave Halloween four stars: "Seeing it, I was reminded of the favorable review I gave a few years ago to Last House on the Left, another really terrifying thriller. Readers wrote to ask how I could possibly support such a movie. But I wasn't supporting it so much as describing it: You don't want to be scared? Don't see it. Credit must be paid to directors who want to really frighten us, to make a good thriller when quite possibly a bad one would have made as much money. Hitchcock is acknowledged as a master of suspense; it's hypocrisy to disapprove of other directors in the same genre who want to scare us too."

Ebert occasionally accused some films of having an unwholesome political agenda, such as his assertion that the film Dirty Harry (1971) had a fascist moral position. He was wary of films passed off as art, which he saw as lurid and sensational. He leveled this charge against such films as The Night Porter (1974).

Ebert commented on films using his Catholic upbringing as a point of reference, and was critical of films he believed were grossly ignorant of or insulting to Catholicism, such as Stigmata (1999) and Priest (1994). He also gave favorable reviews of controversial films with themes or references to Jesus Christ and Catholicism, including The Passion of the Christ (2004), The Last Temptation of Christ (1988), and to Kevin Smith's religious satire Dogma (1999). Ebert was described as an agnostic in 2005, but preferred not being "pigeon-holed".

Contrarian reviews
Writing in an online magazine Hazlitt about Ebert's reviews, Will Sloan argued that "[t]here were inevitably movies where he veered from consensus, but he was not provocative or idiosyncratic by nature." Examples of Ebert dissenting from other critics include his negative reviews of such celebrated films as Blue Velvet ("marred by sophomoric satire and cheap shots"), A Clockwork Orange ("a paranoid right-wing fantasy masquerading as an Orwellian warning"), and The Usual Suspects ("To the degree that I do understand, I don't care").

He also gave a one-star review to the critically acclaimed Abbas Kiarostami film Taste of Cherry, which won the Palme d'Or at the 1997 Cannes Film Festival. Ebert later went on to add the film to a list of his most-hated movies of all time. He was dismissive of the 1988 Bruce Willis action film Die Hard ("inappropriate and wrongheaded interruptions reveal the fragile nature of the plot"), while his positive 3 out of 4 stars review of 1997's Speed 2: Cruise Control ("Movies like this embrace goofiness with an almost sensual pleasure") is one of only three positive reviews accounting for that film's 4% approval rating on the reviewer aggregator website Rotten Tomatoes (one of the two others having been written by his At the Movies co-star Gene Siskel). Ebert reflected on his Speed 2 review in 2013, and wrote that it was "Frequently cited as an example of what a lousy critic I am," but defended his opinion, and noted, "I'm grateful to movies that show me what I haven't seen before, and Speed 2 had a cruise ship plowing right up the main street of a Caribbean village." In 1999, Ebert held a contest for University of Colorado Boulder students to create short films with a Speed 3 theme about an object that could not stop moving. The winning entrant was set on a roller coaster and was screened at Ebertfest that year.

Other interests
Ebert was an admirer of director Werner Herzog, whom he supported through many years when Herzog's popularity had declined. He conducted an onstage public "conversation" with Herzog at the Telluride Film Festival in 2004, after a screening of Herzog's film Invincible at Roger Ebert's Overlooked Film Festival. Herzog dedicated his film Encounters at the End of the World (2008) to Ebert, and Ebert responded with a heartfelt public letter of gratitude. Herzog said he once exhorted Ebert to watch the television reality sitcom The Anna Nicole Show, featuring the former Playboy Playmate, so he could gain a better understanding of the decline in American culture. Ebert did watch it. Ebert was a lifelong reader, and said he had "more or less every book I have owned since I was seven, starting with Huckleberry Finn." Among the authors he considered indispensable were Shakespeare, Henry James, Willa Cather, Colette and Simenon. He writes of his friend William Nack: "He approached literature like a gourmet. He relished it, savored it, inhaled it, and after memorizing it rolled it on his tongue and spoke it aloud. It was Nack who already knew in the early 1960s, when he was a very young man, that Nabokov was perhaps the supreme stylist of modern novelists. He recited to me from Lolita, and from Speak, Memory and Pnin. I was spellbound." Every time Ebert saw Nack, he'd ask him to recite the last lines of The Great Gatsby. Among living authors he admired Cormac McCarthy, and credited Suttree with reviving his love of reading after his illness.

Ebert was also an advocate and supporter of Asian-American cinema, famously coming to the defense of the cast and crew of Justin Lin's Better Luck Tomorrow (2002) during a Sundance Film Festival screening when a white member of the audience asked how Asians could be portrayed in such a negative light and how a film so empty and amoral could be made for Asian-Americans and Americans. Ebert responded that "nobody would say such a thing to a bunch of white filmmakers: How could you do this to 'your people'? ... Asian-American characters have the right to be whoever the hell they want to be. They do not have to represent 'their people'!" He was a supporter of the film after the incident at Sundance, and also supported a number of Asian-American films, having them also screen at his film festival (such as Eric Byler's Charlotte Sometimes).

Ebert attended the Conference on World Affairs at the University of Colorado, Boulder for many years, where he hosted a program called Cinemus Inerruptus. He would analyze a film with an audience, and anyone in the audience could say "Stop!" to point out something they found interesting. He also served on other panels at the conference; he recalls that there he "analyzed dirty jokes with Molly Ivins, the cabaret artist David Finkle, and the London parliamentary correspondent Simon Hoggart... There Margot Adler, the famed Wiccan, drew the moon for me. There I met Betty Dodson, the sexual adventurer, who arrived one year wearing a sculpted brass belt buckle in the form of a vagina. There I asked Ted Turner how he got so much else right, and colorization wrong. There Patch Adams turned up wearing a psychedelic suit and floppy red clown shoes. I rather avoided him until he chased me across a room and announced, 'I agreed with every word of your review of that loathsome film about me.'..Over the years, Temple Grandin, who is autistic and the designer of most of the world's livestock-handling chutes. Buckminster Fuller, who, when I said, 'Hello', responded, 'I see you.'" In 2009, Ebert analyzed Ramin Bahrani's Chop Shop a frame at a time with the director. The next year, they invited Werner Herzog to join them in analyzing Aguirre, the Wrath of God. After that, Ebert announced that he would not return to the conference: "It is fueled by speech, and I'm out of gas... But I went there for my adult lifetime and had a hell of a good time." 

Views on technology
Ebert was a strong advocate for Maxivision 48, in which the movie projector runs at 48 frames per second, as compared to the usual 24 frames per second. He was opposed to the practice whereby theaters lower the intensity of their projector bulbs in order to extend the life of the bulb, arguing that this has little effect other than to make the film harder to see. Ebert was skeptical of the resurgence of 3D effects in film, which he found unrealistic and distracting.

In 2005, Ebert opined that video games are not art, and are inferior to media created through authorial control, such as film and literature, stating, "video games can be elegant, subtle, sophisticated, challenging and visually wonderful," but "the nature of the medium prevents it from moving beyond craftsmanship to the stature of art." This resulted in negative reaction from video game enthusiasts, such as writer Clive Barker, who defended video games as an art form. Ebert wrote a further piece in response to Barker. Ebert maintained his position in 2010, but conceded that he should not have expressed this skepticism without being more familiar with the actual experience of playing them. He admitted that he barely played video games: "I have played Cosmology of Kyoto which I enormously enjoyed, and Myst for which I lacked the patience." In the article, Ebert wrote, "It is quite possible a game could someday be great art."

Ebert had reviewed Cosmology of Kyoto for Wired in 1994, and had praised the exploration, depth, and graphics found in the game, writing "This is the most beguiling computer game I have encountered, a seamless blend of information, adventure, humor, and imagination - the gruesome side-by-side with the divine." Ebert filed one other video game-related article for Wired in 1994, describing his visit to Sega's Joypolis arcade in Tokyo.

Personal life

 Marriage 
At age 50, Ebert married trial attorney Charlie "Chaz" Hammelsmith (formerly Chaz Hammel-Smith) in 1992. He explained in his memoir, Life Itself, that he did not want to marry before his mother died, as he was afraid of displeasing her. In a July 2012 blog entry titled "Roger loves Chaz," Ebert wrote, "She fills my horizon, she is the great fact of my life, she has my love, she saved me from the fate of living out my life alone, which is where I seemed to be heading." Chaz Ebert became vice president of the Ebert Company and has emceed Ebertfest.

 Alcoholism recovery 
Ebert was a recovering alcoholic, having quit drinking in 1979. He was a member of Alcoholics Anonymous and had written some blog entries on the subject. Ebert was a longtime friend of Oprah Winfrey, and Winfrey credited him with persuading her to syndicate The Oprah Winfrey Show, which became the highest-rated talk show in American television history.

 Politics 
A supporter of the Democratic Party, Ebert publicly urged leftist filmmaker Michael Moore to give a politically charged acceptance speech at the Academy Awards: "I'd like to see Michael Moore get up there and let 'em have it with both barrels and really let loose and give them a real rabble-rousing speech." During a 1996 panel at the University of Colorado Boulder's Conference on World Affairs, Ebert coined the Boulder Pledge, by which he vowed never to purchase anything offered through the result of an unsolicited email message, or to forward chain emails or mass emails to others. Ebert endorsed Barack Obama for re-election as president in 2012, citing the Affordable Care Act as one important reason for his support of Obama. However, he was also sympathetic to Ron Paul, noting that he "speaks directly and clearly without a lot of hot air and lip flap". During a review of the 2008 documentary I.O.U.S.A., he credited Paul with being "a lonely voice talking about the debt", proposing based on the film that the US government was "already broke".

 Beliefs 
Ebert was critical of intelligent design, and stated that people who believe in either creationism or New Age beliefs such as crystal healing or astrology are not qualified to be president. Ebert also expressed disbelief in pseudoscientific or supernatural claims in general, calling them "woo-woo," though he has argued that reincarnation is possible from a "scientific, rationalist point of view."

Discussing his beliefs, in 2009, Ebert wrote that he did not "want to provide a category for people to apply to [him]" because he "would not want [his] convictions reduced to a word," and stated, "I have never said, although readers have freely informed me I am an atheist, an agnostic, or at the very least a secular humanist – which I am." In the same blog entry, he also said, "I am not a believer, not an atheist, not an agnostic. I am still awake at night, asking how? I am more content with the question than I would be with an answer." In March 2013, he wrote, "I support freedom of choice. My choice is to not support abortion, except in cases of a clear-cut choice between the lives of the mother and child. A child conceived through incest or rape is innocent and deserves the right to be born." He also stated, "I consider myself Catholic, lock, stock, and barrel, with this technical loophole: I cannot believe in God. I refuse to call myself an atheist, however, because that indicates too great a certainty about the unknowable". He had previously identified as Catholic in his reviews of movies about Jesus, most notably in his review of Gibson's The Passion of the Christ.

He wrote that "I drank for many years in a tavern that had a photograph of Brendan Behan on the wall, and under it is this quotation, which I memorized: '''I respect kindness in human beings first of all, and kindness to animals. I don't respect the law; I have a total irreverence for anything concerned with society except that which makes the roads safer, the beer stronger, the food cheaper and the old men and the old women warmer in the winter and happier in the summer.' For 57 words, that does a pretty good job of summing it up." Summarizing his beliefs, Ebert wrote:

Health

In early 2002, Ebert was diagnosed with papillary thyroid cancer which was successfully removed in February 2002. In 2003, he underwent surgery for cancer in his salivary gland, which was followed up by radiation therapy. He was again diagnosed with cancer in 2006. In June of that year, he had surgery to remove cancerous tissue in the right side of his jaw. A week later he had a life-threatening complication when his carotid artery burst near the surgery site. He was confined to bed rest and was unable to speak, eat, or drink for a time, necessitating the use of a feeding tube.

The complications kept Ebert off the air for an extended period. Ebert made his first public appearance since mid-2006 at Ebertfest on April 25, 2007. He was unable to speak, instead communicating through his wife. He returned to reviewing on May 18, 2007, when three of his reviews were published in print. In July 2007, he revealed that he was still unable to speak. Ebert adopted a computerized voice system to communicate, eventually using a copy of his own voice created from his recordings by CereProc. In February 2010, Chris Jones wrote a lengthy profile of Ebert and his health in Esquire. In March 2010, his health trials and new computerized voice were featured on The Oprah Winfrey Show. In 2011, Ebert gave a TED talk assisted by his wife, Chaz, and friends Dean Ornish and John Hunter, called "Remaking my voice". In it, he proposed a test to determine the realism of a synthesized voice.

Ebert underwent further surgery in January 2008 to try to restore his voice and address the complications from his previous surgeries. On April 1, Ebert announced his speech had not been restored. Ebert underwent further surgery in April 2008 after fracturing his hip in a fall. By 2011, Ebert was using a prosthetic chin to hide some of the damage done by his many chin, mouth, and throat surgeries.

In December 2012, Ebert was hospitalized due to the fractured hip, which was subsequently determined to be the result of cancer.

Regarding his loss of eating, Ebert wrote that what was sad was “The loss of dining, not the loss of food. It may be personal, but for me, unless I'm alone, it doesn't involve dinner if it doesn't involve talking. The food and drink I can do without easily. The jokes, gossip, laughs, arguments and shared memories I miss. Sentences beginning with the words, ‘Remember that time?’ I ran in crowds where anyone was likely to break out in a poetry recitation at any time. Me too. But not me anymore. So yes, it's sad. Maybe that's why I enjoy this blog. You don't realize it, but we're at dinner right now.”

Death
Four years before his death, Ebert wrote: 

On April 4, 2013, Ebert died at age 70 at a hospital in Chicago, shortly before he was set to return to his home and enter hospice care. Then-President Barack Obama wrote, "For a generation of Americans - and especially Chicagoans - Roger was the movies... [he could capture] the unique power of the movies to take us somewhere magical. ... The movies won't be the same without Roger." Steven Spielberg stated that Ebert's "reviews went far deeper than simply thumbs up or thumbs down. He wrote with passion through a real knowledge of film and film history, and in doing so, helped many movies find their audiences. ... [He] put television criticism on the map." Martin Scorsese released a statement saying, "The death of Roger Ebert is an incalculable loss for movie culture and for film criticism. And it's a loss for me personally ... there was a professional distance between us, but then I could talk to him much more freely than I could to other critics. Really, Roger was my friend. It's that simple." Robert Redford called Ebert "one of the great champions of freedom of artistic expression" and said, "His personal passion for cinema was boundless, and that is sure to be his legacy for generations to come." Christopher Nolan said of Ebert, "He never became jaded… even while bringing a very thoughtful critical eye." Michael Phillips of the Chicago Tribune recalled that "I came late to film criticism in Chicago, after writing about the theater. Roger loved the theater. His was a theatrical personality: a raconteur, a spinner of dinner-table stories, a man who was not shy about his accomplishments. But he made room in that theatrical, improbable, outsized life for others." Salon's Andrew O'Hehir wrote that "He's up there with Will Rogers, H. L. Mencken, A. J. Liebling and not too far short of Mark Twain as one of the great plainspoken commentators on American life." The Onion paid tribute to Ebert: "Roger Ebert Hails Human Existence As 'A Triumph'".

Hundreds of people attended the funeral Mass held at Chicago's Holy Name Cathedral on April 8, 2013, where Ebert was celebrated as a film critic, newspaperman, advocate for social justice, and husband. Father Michael Pfleger concluded the service with "the balconies of heaven are filled with angels singing 'Thumbs Up' ".

Memorials and legacy

A nearly-three-hour public tribute, entitled Roger Ebert: A Celebration of Life, was held on April 11, 2013, at the Chicago Theatre. It featured in-person remembrances, video testimonials, video and film clips, and gospel choirs, and was, according to the Chicago Tribune Mark Caro, "a laughter- and sorrow-filled send-off from the entertainment and media worlds."

In September 2013, organizers in Champaign, Illinois, announced plans to raise $125,000 to build a life-size bronze statue of Ebert in the town, which was unveiled in front of the Virginia Theatre at Ebertfest on April 24, 2014. The composition was selected by his widow, Chaz Ebert, and depicts Ebert sitting in the middle of three theater seats giving a "thumbs up."

The 2013 Toronto International Film Festival opened with a video tribute of Ebert at Roy Thomson Hall during the world premiere of the WikiLeaks-based film The Fifth Estate. Ebert had been an avid supporter of the festival since its inception in the 1970s. Chaz was in attendance to accept a plaque on Roger's behalf.

In August of 2013, the Plaza Classic Film Festival in El Paso, Texas paid tribute to Ebert by showing seven films that played a role in his life: Citizen Kane, The Third Man, La Dolce Vita, Beyond the Valley of the Dolls, Fitzcarraldo and Goodfellas.

At the 86th Academy Awards ceremony, Ebert was included in the in memoriam montage, a rare honor for a film critic.

In 2014, the documentary Life Itself was released. Director Steve James, whose films had been widely advocated by Ebert, started making the documentary while Ebert was still alive. Martin Scorsese served as an executive producer. The film studies Ebert's life and career, while also filming Ebert during his final months, and includes interviews with his family and friends. It was universally praised by critics. It has a 98% approval rating on Rotten Tomatoes.

Werner Herzog told Entertainment Weekly that Ebert was "a soldier of the cinema": “I always loved Roger for being the good soldier, not only the good soldier of cinema, but he was a wounded soldier who for years in his affliction held out and plowed on and soldiered on and held the outpost that was given up by almost everyone: The monumental shift now is that intelligent, deep discourse about cinema has been something that has been vanishing over the last maybe two decades...I've always tried to be a good soldier of cinema myself, so of course since he’s gone, I will plow on, as I have plowed on all my life, but I will do what I have to do as if Roger was looking over my shoulder. And I am not gonna disappoint him.”

Ebert was inducted as a laureate of The Lincoln Academy of Illinois. In 2001, the governor of Illinois awarded him the state's highest honor, the Order of Lincoln, in the area of performing arts. In 2016, Ebert was inducted into the Chicago Literary Hall of Fame.

The website RogerEbert.com contains an archive of every review Ebert wrote, as well as many essays and opinion pieces. The site, now operated by Ebert Digital (a partnership between Chaz and friend Josh Golden), continues to publish new material written by a group of critics who were selected by Ebert before his death.

Awards and honors 
Ebert received many awards during his long and distinguished career as a film critic and television host.  He was the first film critic to ever win a Pulitzer Prize, receiving the Pulitzer Prize for Criticism in 1975 while working for the Chicago Sun-Times, "for his film criticism during 1974".

In 2003, Ebert was honored by the American Society of Cinematographers winning a Special Achievement Award. In 2005, Ebert received a Star on the Hollywood Walk of Fame for his work on television. His star is located at 6834 Hollywood Blvd. In 2009, Ebert received the Directors Guild of America Award's for Honorary Life Member Award. In 2010, Ebert received the Webby Award for Person of the Year.

In 2007, Ebert was honored by the Gotham Awards receiving a tribute and award for his lifetime contributions to independent film.

On May 15, 2009, Ebert was honored by the American Pavilion at the Cannes Film Festival by the renaming of its conference room, "The Roger Ebert Conference Center." Martin Scorsese joined Ebert and his wife Chaz at the ribbon-cutting ceremony.

Honors
1975 – Pulitzer Prize for Criticism
1995 – Publicists Guild of America Press Award
2003 – American Society of Cinematographers's Special Achievement Award 
2004 – Savannah Film Festival's Lifetime Achievement Award
2007 – Gotham Award's Lifetime Achievement Award
2009 – Directors Guild of America Award' Honorary Life Member Award 
2010 – Webby Award for Person of the Year

Published works
Each year from 1986 to 1998, Ebert published Roger Ebert's Movie Home Companion (retitled Roger Ebert's Video Companion for its last five installments), which collected all of his movie reviews to that point. From 1999 to 2013 (except in 2008), Ebert instead published Roger Ebert's Movie Yearbook, a collection of all of his movie reviews from the previous two and a half years (for example, the 2011 edition, covers January 2008 – July 2010.) Both series also included yearly essays, interviews, and other writings. He also wrote the following books:
 An Illini Century: One Hundred Years of Campus Life (1967) – a history of the first 100 years of the University of Illinois. (no ISBN)
 A Kiss Is Still a Kiss (1984)
 The Perfect London Walk (1986), with Daniel Curley – a tour of London, Ebert's favorite foreign city.
 Two Weeks In Midday Sun: A Cannes Notebook (1987) – coverage of the 1987 Cannes Film Festival, which was also the 40th anniversary of the festival, plus comments about the previous 12 festivals Ebert had attended. Interviews with John Malkovich, Barbara Hershey, and Isabella Rossellini.
 The Future of The Movies (1991), with Gene Siskel – collected interviews with Martin Scorsese, Steven Spielberg, and George Lucas about the future of motion pictures and film preservation. It is the only book co-authored by Siskel and Ebert.
 Behind the Phantom's Mask (1993) – Ebert's only work of fiction, which is about an on-stage murder and the resulting attention put on a previously unknown actor.
 Ebert's Little Movie Glossary (1994) – a book of movie clichés.
 Roger Ebert's Book of Film (1996) – a Norton Anthology of a century of writing about the movies.
 Questions for the Movie Answer Man (1997) – his responses to questions sent from his readers.
 Ebert's Bigger Little Movie Glossary (1999) – a "greatly expanded" book of movie clichés.
 I Hated, Hated, Hated This Movie (2000) – a collection of reviews of films that received two stars or fewer, dating to the beginning of his Sun-Times career. (The title comes from his zero-star review of the 1994 film North.)
 The Great Movies (2002), The Great Movies II (2005), The Great Movies III (2010) and The Great Movies IV (2016) – four books of essays about great films., and 
 Awake in the Dark: The Best of Roger Ebert (2006) – a collection of essays from his 40 years as a film critic, featuring interviews, profiles, essays, his initial reviews upon a film's release, as well as critical exchanges between the film critics Richard Corliss and Andrew Sarris.
 Your Movie Sucks (2007) – a collection of fewer-than-two-star reviews, for movies released between 2000 and 2006. (The title comes from his zero-star review of the 2005 film Deuce Bigalow: European Gigolo.)
 Roger Ebert's Four-Star Reviews 1967–2007 (2007)
 Scorsese by Ebert (2008) – covers works by director Martin Scorsese from 1967 to 2008, plus 11 interviews with the director over that period.
 The Pot and How to Use It: The Mystery and Romance of the Rice cooker (2010)
 Life Itself: A Memoir. (2011) New York: Grand Central Publishing.
 A Horrible Experience of Unbearable Length (2012) – a third book of fewer-than-two-star reviews, for movies released in 2006 and onward. (The title comes from his one-star review of the 2009 film Transformers: Revenge of the Fallen.)

See also
 Ebert test

Notes

References

Further reading
 Bruce J. Evensen. "Ebert, Roger (18 June 1942–04 April 2013)" American National Biography (2015) [www.anb.org/viewbydoi/10.1093/anb/9780198606697.article.1603924 online]

External links

 
 
 Roger Ebert's critic page at Rotten Tomatoes
 
 
 
 
 

 
1942 births
2013 deaths
20th-century American male writers
20th-century American non-fiction writers
21st-century American male writers
21st-century American non-fiction writers
American agnostics
American film critics
American film historians
American humanists
American male bloggers
American bloggers
American male non-fiction writers
American male screenwriters
American memoirists
American people of Dutch descent
American people of German descent
American people of Irish descent
American people with disabilities
Chicago Sun-Times people
Critics of creationism
Deaths from cancer in Illinois
Deaths from thyroid cancer
Film theorists
Former Roman Catholics
Illinois Democrats
Pulitzer Prize for Criticism winners
Screenwriters from Illinois
Secular humanists
Television personalities from Chicago
University of Cape Town alumni
University of Chicago alumni
University of Chicago faculty
University of Illinois Urbana-Champaign College of Media alumni
Writers from Chicago
Writers from Urbana, Illinois
Writers with disabilities
Siskel and Ebert